K.Kotapadu is a mandal in Anakapalli district in the state of Andhra Pradesh in India.

Villages 
 Varada 
 Pothanavalasa
 Ugginavalasa
 Ramayogi Agraharam 
 K. Jagannadhapuram
 Gavarapalem 
 Koruvada 
 Deekshitula Agraharam
 Pindrangi
 Srungavaram
 Gotlam
 Pathavalasa 
 Marri Valasa 
 Dali Valasa 
 Singannaddorapalem
 Sureddipalem
 Alamandakoduru
 Alamanda Bheemavaram
 Medicherla
 Kintada Kotapadu 
 Kintada
 Ksanthapalem
 Kavi. Kondala Agraharam 
 Sudicalasa
 Chendrayyapeta
 Arle
 Gondupalem 
 Paidampeta
 Rongalinaidupalem 
 Gullepalle
 Chowduvada
 Garugubilli

Notable people 
 Tekumalla Achyutarao (18 April 1880 – 12 February 1947)   was one of a major critics in Telugu language was a famous person in this village. He known for his English work "Pingali Suranarya"(Pingali Suranna, his life and works).

References 

Villages in Anakapalli district